Trypocopris pyrenaeus is a species of dor beetles.

Subspecies
 Trypocopris pyrenaeus cyanicolor Capra, 1930
 Trypocopris pyrenaeus splendens Heer, 1841
 Trypocopris pyrenaeus pyrenaeus (Charpentier, 1825)

Distribution

This species is present in Andorra, British Islands, Bulgaria, France, Italy, Luxembourg and Spain.

Description
These beetles are blackish, with green, blue and violet glare. The elytra are shiny and rather smooth, without any striae. The pronotum is a little punctured.

Biology
Adults can be found from spring to summer. These beetles are coprophagus, occasionally mycophagous. They usually carry to the nest portions of animal droppings, on which the females will deposit the eggs.

References

Geotrupidae
Beetles described in 1825